Prithvi is a Sanskrit word for the Earth, and also a Hindu earth goddess.

Prithvi may also refer to:

 Prithvi (missile), a ballistic missile
 Prithvi (1997 film), a Hindi-language film
 Prithvi (2010 film), a Kannada-language film
 Prithvi Chand, Indian politician
 Prithviraj Sukumaran, (born 1982), Indian actor
 Prithvi (musician), Indian music producer

See also